Selçuk Eker (born December 18, 1991 in Gebze, Kocaeli Province, Turkey) is a  Turkish amateur boxer competing in the flyweight division.

He qualified for participation at the 2012 Summer Olympics after he won the silver medal at the 2012 European Boxing Olympic Qualification Tournament held in Trabzon, Turkey.

References

1991 births
People from Gebze
Living people
Flyweight boxers
Kocaeli Büyükşehir Belediyesi Kağıt Spor boxers
Olympic boxers of Turkey
Boxers at the 2012 Summer Olympics
Turkish male boxers
Boxers at the 2015 European Games
European Games competitors for Turkey
Boxers at the 2016 Summer Olympics